Jiva! (stylized as JIVA!) is a South African drama television series created by Busisiwe Ntintili and Bakang Sebatjane and directed by Scottnes L. Smith and Mandla Dube. The series premiered on Netflix on June 24, 2021.

Synopsis 
A talented street dancer from Umlazi, Durban must confront her fears and deal with family objections to pursue her dancing dreams.

Cast 

 Noxolo Dlamini as Ntombi
 Candice Modiselle as Vuyiswa
 Sne Mbatha as Zinhle
 Stella Dlangalala as Lady E
 Zazi Kunene as Nolwazi
 Ntuthuzelo Grootboom as Makhekhe "Nathi"
 Given Stuurman as Samukelo "Samu"
 Tony Kgoroge as Bra Zo
 Anga Makubalo as DJ Sika 
 Sibulele Gcilitshana as Thuleleni
 Zamani Mbatha as Bheki
 Kagiso Modupe as Menzi

Production

Development 
It was reported that Netflix is making an African series.

Episodes

Season 1 (2021)

References

External links 
 
 
 

2021 South African television series debuts
2020s South African television series
South African drama television series
English-language Netflix original programming
Television shows set in South Africa